Bukhara magazine is a Persian-language magazine published in Tehran and edited by Ali Dehbashi. The magazine began publication in 1998 and is published on a monthly basis. The content consists of scholarly articles on Persian history, art, philosophy, literature, culture, and Iranology. The magazine has published several special issues on great world authors such as Rabindranath Tagore, Günter Grass, Osip Mandelstam, Umberto Eco and Virginia Woolf.

Ali Dehbashi was the editor of the monthly magazine KELK, a prominent literary publication on Iranian Studies with a considerable number of readers, mostly Iranian university professors and world Iranologists. Ninety-four issues of the magazine comprising more than twenty thousand pages have been published, with contributions from notables such as Shafiee Kadkani, Abdolhossein Zarrinkoob, Ahmad Mahdavi Damghani, Saeed Hamidian, Djalal Khaleghi Motlagh, Ali Ravaghi, Fereydoon Moshiri, Ghamar Aryan, Ezatollah Fouldvand, Bahram Beyzai and others. 

Bukhara′s official representative/distributor in North America is the Toronto-based weekly publication Salam Toronto.

References

External links
 Official website

1998 establishments in Iran
Literary magazines published in Iran
Magazines established in 1998
Magazines published in Tehran
Monthly magazines published in Iran
Persian-language magazines